A list of British films released in 2005:

2005

See also
 2005 in film
 2005 in British music
 2005 in British radio
 2005 in British television
 2005 in the United Kingdom
 List of 2005 box office number-one films in the United Kingdom

References

External links

2005
Films
British